West Juneau is a populated place in Juneau, Alaska, United States. Despite its location on Douglas Island, the neighborhood was juridically a part of the City of Juneau, rather than the City of Douglas, prior to municipal unification in 1970.

The area is predominantly residential, with minor marine-related industrial uses occurring along the shoreline. There are a number of large condominium developments and a public housing project, with the remainder of the residences being primarily single-family. The neighborhood previously had a grocery store, until it was removed to make way for a roundabout at the Douglas Island end of the Juneau-Douglas Bridge.

References

Populated coastal places in Alaska on the Pacific Ocean
Populated places in Juneau, Alaska